Capers Island is a state-owned barrier island on the Atlantic Ocean in Charleston County, South Carolina about 15 miles north of the city of Charleston.  It is separated from the mainland by salt marshes and the Intracoastal Waterway.  To the southwest it is separated from the barrier island Dewees Island by Capers Inlet.  To the northwest, it is separated from the barrier island Bulls Island by Price Inlet.

The island is named for Bishop William Theodotus Capers, a native of South Carolina.

Visiting
Capers Island is undeveloped and maintained by the State of South Carolina.  There is a small dock on Capers Inlet that has a boardwalk across the marsh to an unpaved nature trail which leads to the beach approximately 1 mile to the southeast.  Primitive camping is permitted.  However, a free permit must be acquired from the State Department of Natural Resources and is limited to 80 campers per night in no more than 20 groups.

Natural Habitat
Capers Island is a barrier island with a number of discrete habitats including:
Maritime uplands
Sandy beach
Salt marsh
Brackish ponds

Flora
Plant species on the island include:
Sabal palm

Fauna
Numerous animal species inhabit the island and surrounding waters and marshes on a seasonal or permanent basis.

Mammals
Raccoon
White-tailed deer
Bottlenose dolphins

Birds
Bald eagle
Osprey
Egret
Heron
Ibis
Bittern
Brown pelican

Reptiles
American alligator
Loggerhead sea turtle
eastern diamondback rattlesnake
timber rattlesnake
carolina pygmy rattlesnake
cottonmouth

Fish
Bull shark
White shark
Bonnethead shark
Sea trout
Red drum
Flounder
Black drum
King whiting
Spot
Pompano
Croaker
red drum

Crustaceans
Shrimp
Ghost crab
Blue crab
Fiddler crab

Mollusks
Oyster

References

Islands of South Carolina
Barrier islands of South Carolina